Manuela “Manu” Lareo Polanco (born 29 May 1992) is a Spanish-born Dominican footballer who plays as a left attacking midfielder for Segunda División Pro club RCD Espanyol and the Dominican Republic women's national team.

Early life
Lareo was born in Vitoria-Gasteiz to a Spanish father and a Dominican mother.

Club career
Lareo is a CD Aurrerá de Vitoria product. She has played for Athletic Bilbao, Valencia CF and Real Sociedad in Spain.

International career
Lareo represented Spain at the 2010 UEFA Women's Under-19 Championship. In December 2015, she played for the Basque Country in a 1–1 draw with Catalonia at Mini Estadi. On 30 June 2021, she was called up by the Dominican Republic.

Honours
Real Sociedad
 Copa de la Reina: 2018–19 

 Athletic Bilbao
 Copa de la Reina: runner-up 2012

Valencia
 Copa de la Reina: runner-up 2015

References

External links
 
 Profile at La Liga 
 Profile at aupaAthletic.com
 Profile at Athletic Bilbao

1992 births
Living people
Citizens of the Dominican Republic through descent
Dominican Republic women's footballers
Women's association football midfielders
Women's association football forwards
Dominican Republic women's international footballers
Dominican Republic people of Spanish descent
Footballers from Vitoria-Gasteiz
Spanish women's footballers
CD Aurrerá de Vitoria footballers
Athletic Club Femenino players
Valencia CF Femenino players
Real Sociedad (women) players
RCD Espanyol Femenino players
Primera División (women) players
Segunda Federación (women) players
Spain women's youth international footballers
Spanish people of Dominican Republic descent
Sportspeople of Dominican Republic descent